Trinchesia alpha is a species of sea slug, an aeolid nudibranch, a marine gastropod mollusc in the family Trinchesiidae.

Distribution
This species was described from the shore of Kozuchi-jima near the Tamano Marine Laboratory, Tamano, Inland Sea of Seto, Japan; it also occurs off New Zealand.

Description 
The typical adult size of this species is 13–15 mm.

References 

 Spencer, H.G., Marshall, B.A. & Willan, R.C. (2009). Checklist of New Zealand living Mollusca. pp 196–219. in: Gordon, D.P. (ed.) New Zealand inventory of biodiversity. Volume one. Kingdom Animalia: Radiata, Lophotrochozoa, Deuterostomia. Canterbury University Press, Christchurch

External links
 Baba, K.; Hamatani, I. (1963). A cuthonid, Cuthona alpha n. sp., with a radula of Catriona type (Nudibranchia Eolidoidea). Publications of the Seto Marine Biological Laboratory. 11(2): 339-343
  Spencer H.G., Willan R.C., Marshall B.A. & Murray T.J. (2011). Checklist of the Recent Mollusca Recorded from the New Zealand Exclusive Economic Zone

Trinchesiidae
Gastropods described in 1963